The proposed Kallak mine is a, highly controversial, plan to exploit one of the largest unexploited iron ore deposits in Sweden.

Background
The mining of iron ore in Sweden is a huge industry and is centred mainly in northern Sweden. The country holds 60% of Europe's identified iron ore deposits and is  responsible for 90% of Europe's iron ore extraction and 5% of the world's reserves in 2014.
 
More than 96% of total ore production comes from the mines in the northern region, known as Norrland. Comprising 10 of the 12 active mines in the country, these mines lie in Sápmi (historically "Lapland"), the traditional territory of the Sámi, the only Indigenous people in Scandinavia.

Location and community

The proposed site of a new mine known as Kallak (the Swedish form of Gállok, the original name of the place in the Lule Saami language) is located on an island in the hydropower-regulated Little Lule River between the (non-Sami) villages of Björkholmen and Randijaur in the municipality of Jokkmokk in the province of Norrbotten in northern Sweden. It is located near to the hydropower plant Parki, and the regulation reservoirs Parkijaure and Randijaure. Björkholmen and Randijaur have around 100 inhabitants, constituting the permanent residents of Gállok/Kallak.

The site is on the ancestral lands of the indigenous Sami people and forms part of the reindeer winter grazing lands of the Sami community of Jåhkågasska tjiellde. The community consists of approximately one hundred members, of which around half work directly with reindeer herding. While this is the community primarily affected by the mining proposal, two other neighbouring Sámi communities would also be indirectly affected.

Mining exploration
The Kallak north and Kallak south prospects were identified by the Geological Survey of Sweden in the 1940s. In the late 1960s the SGU identified Kallak north as containing 92 million tonnes of ore and Kallak south as containing 29 million tonnes of ore at a grade of roughly 35%.

Beowulf Mining acquired the Kallak north licence in 2006, and a drill program conducted in 2010 has found at least 175 Mt of Iron at an average grade of 30%. Beowulf acquired the Kallak south licence from Tasman Metals in mid-2010. An ongoing drill program has shown Kallak south to contain at least 400 million tonnes of Iron at an average grade of 30%.

In mid-2010 an independent conceptual study performed by the Raw Materials Group showed that the Kallak north deposit, which at the time was thought to contain 150 million tonnes of iron at 30% grading, was commercially viable.

Impact and resistance
The plans to establish a mine at the site have met resistance from the indigenous Saami people as well as other local inhabitants and have also raised concerns in regard to dam safety, within the  hydro power regulated Lule River. On 1 July 2013, protesters set up a road blockade in order to prevent test drilling. On 30 July, the blockade was dismantled by the police, but on the next day the blockade was set up again.

Dam safety research points at the problems of combining hydro power with tailing dams, within the same system. In Sweden this would be the first time such a combination is made, and thereby this would be a full-scale experiment with major risks for people and drinking water provision downstream, amongst other the cities of Boden and Luleå.

In 2014, Norrbotten County said no to further mining in Kallak; the case would be closed if the Swedish governmental geology decision-making body Bergsstaten had agreed with Norrbotten County. However, Bergsstaten overruled the county and it was up to the government of Sweden to give a final answer to the question.

In summer 2019 over 1000 people got together in a Rainbow Gathering tent camp in Kallak in solidarity with the Sámi people. 

In February 2020, the Swedish Government finally refused their application. However Beowulf has continued to express an interest in mining at Kallak. In December 2021, the new Prime Minister of Sweden, Magdalena Andersson, said that Sweden needed more mines, and shares rose in Beowulf after this announcement. With Swedish Green Party, which opposed the project, no longer in the governing coalition, the issue of allowance for the mining project reopened. In February 2022 advisors of the U.N. Human Rights Council and local Saami population protested against it together with Greta Thunberg. On February 2, 2022, the Sámi Parliament of Sweden submitted its opinion concerning a new mine in Kallak to the Ministry of Enterprise and Innovation (Sweden). 

Despite the protests, on March 22, 2022, the Swedish Ministry of Enterprise, Energy and Communications, under a set of environmental protection-related conditions, gave a permission to Beowulf to proceed with the mining project. Before the mine is established, the project needs to be approved by the Swedish environmental court.

See also
 Alta controversy
 Environmental racism in Europe

References

External links
Official website of the Beowulf company

Iron mines in Sweden